The Breccia Crags are rock crags,  high, standing  west of Petter Bay in the southeast end of Coronation Island, in the South Orkney Islands. They were named by the UK Antarctic Place-Names Committee following the 1956–58 survey by the Falkland Islands Dependencies Survey. The feature is of geological interest owing to the contact of brecciated schist (breccia) and conglomerate.

References 

Cliffs of the South Orkney Islands